Warrea is a genus of flowering plants from the orchid family, Orchidaceae. It has three known species, all native to Latin America.

Warrea costaricensis Schltr. - Chiapas, Costa Rica, Guatemala, Honduras, Panama
Warrea hookeriana (Rchb.f.) Rolfe - Peru
Warrea warreana (Lodd. ex Lindl.) C.Schweinf. - from Colombia and Venezuela south to Argentina

See also 
 List of Orchidaceae genera

References

External links 

Zygopetalinae genera
Zygopetalinae